The 2021 Philippines Football League (known as The Philippines Football League brought to you by Qatar Airways for sponsorship reasons) was to be the fifth season of Philippines Football League (PFL), professional football league of the Philippines. However, the season was cancelled due to the COVID-19 pandemic.

Cancellation
The league's 2021 season was scheduled to kick off on August 21, 2021, but was postponed due to the implementation of enhanced community quarantine in Metro Manila and nearby provinces. It was postponed again for several times. The latest schedule for the season's start date was on October 27, 2021, provided that Cavite is under general community quarantine by October 16 and there are at least six confirmed participating clubs.

The 2021 season was cancelled on October 22, 2021, and it was announced that the league cup tournament, 2021 Copa Paulino Alcantara, would be held in its place. It will start on  November 7, 2021. The organization of the Copa Paulino Alcantara was previously uncertain, having not been held during the previous season.

Stadium

Like previously, all games of 2021 season were planned to be held at the PFF National Training Center in Carmona, Cavite, under a close-circuit format due to prevailing COVID-19 pandemic. Biñan Football Stadium in Biñan, Laguna is being considered as a potential second venue.

Teams
Cebu F.C. was given a provisional club license, which would have allowed the club to debut in the now cancelled 2021 season. Laos and Rapids F.C. from Cagayan de Oro were the other applicant clubs.

Personnel and kits

Coaching changes

1.  Named head coach for the 2020 season but was not able to coach the team. Withe was hired for the 2020 AFC Champions League due to having the appropriate pro coaching license to lead a club in the continenal tournament.
1.  Coached for the club at the 2020 AFC Champions League.

Foreign players
A maximum of five foreigners are allowed per club, with four players of any nationality and a fifth coming from an AFC member nation. This is a change from the previous four seasons which followed the AFC's "3+1" rule. This resulted from an earlier press conference dubbed We Are PFL 2021, where managers of the clubs expressed a desire to increase the foreign quota from four to five.

Notes
1. Now a naturalized citizen of the Philippines. Sporting nationality change was subject to be confirmed by FIFA.

References

Philippines
Philippines
Philippines Football League seasons
Philippines